Tricondyla aptera is a beetle species in the family of Cicindelidae. This species is found in Australia, Indonesia, Philippines, Papua New Guinea, and Solomon Islands.

References

Tricondyla
Beetles described in 1790
Beetles of Australia
Insects of Indonesia
Insects of the Philippines
Insects of Papua New Guinea
Insects of the Solomon Islands